The Tamil Nadu Institute of Labour Studies, is a general degree college located at Chennai, Tamil Nadu. It was established in the year 1973. The college is affiliated with University of Madras. This college offers bachelor's and master's degree courses in Labour Management.

References

External links
Webpage

Educational institutions established in 1973
1973 establishments in Tamil Nadu
Colleges affiliated to University of Madras
Universities and colleges in Chennai